Kulhudhuffushi (Dhivehi) is the capital of Haa Dhaalu Atoll administrative division on Thiladhunmathi Atoll in the north of the Maldives. Kulhudhuffushi is known as the "Heart of the North". The island is famous for its mangroves (kulhi), after which the island itself is named.

History
In the years 1812, 1819 and 1921, the island was affected by heavy rains and storms, causing substantial damage. The island was also affected during the Keylakunu storm which lost half the population of the island. Since then the island has been famous for unity and hardworkers around the Maldives. The ancient people of the island of Kulhudhuffushi were famous for the courage and bravery during the wars fought against the enemies of the nation. Apart from that, the people of Kulhudhuffushi City led the whole atoll Thiladhunmathi in a rebellion act held against the Malé government during the 1940s because of the unjust governance for the people of the north at the time.

Geography

The island is one of the biggest and most populous islands in the Northern part of the Maldives.
The island itself is the administrative capital of the South Thiladhunmathi Atoll

Transport
The new Kulhudhuffushi Airport  has been opened in August 2019 and now serves the island.

Demography

Economy 
Kulhudhuffushi City is the economic capital of the northern Maldives. Residents of the city and surrounding settlements are mostly employed in the service or produce sectors; such as the local Saturday Market. Saturday market is a market which is held in every Saturday at "Bandaara road" Kulhudhuffushi, where local farmers products and domestic food is available. Hundreds of islanders of Thiladhunmathi visit for shopping and business to Kulhudhuffushi City mostly on Saturdays.

People from the island are known and famous for shark fishing, blacksmith works, producing coir rope, building boats and working in cargo vessels. The culture of the island have its own uniqueness until now.

Education

H.Dh Kulhudhuffushi includes 5 schools.

Health
Kulhudhuffushi Regional Hospital is an A-category hospital that serves the residents of the island and the islands of the region.

Sport
Azneem Ahmed qualified for the 100-meter sprint in the 2012 London Olympics. Kulhudhuffushi is regarded as the basketball champions of the Maldives. Adam Ismail was a footballer during late 1950s at the time when Maldives got independence and started playing international football and also a martial artist. Football is the most widely played sport and the island holds the highest number of quality football grounds around the nation except Male'. The national 2015 President's Cup Group A matches were held in Kulhudhuffushi.

Notable residents
Azneem Ahmed - An Olympic sprinter who holds three national records.
Corporal Hussain Adam - A Maldivian soldier who died while defending the Maldives National Defense Force headquarters, during the 1988 Maldives coup d'état on 3 November 1988
Late Adam Ismail - A sports person and huge role model for the youth. He played as a captain of Maldivian national team in the first international match played bymaldives against queen Elizabeth's during ibrahim nasirs era. He was also a gymnastic teacher and a football coach during his time.

References

Populated places in the Maldives
Islands of the Maldives